A joulutorttu (Finnish lit. "Yule tart", ; sometimes known as tähtitorttu "star tart") is a Finnish Christmas pastry. It is traditionally made from puff pastry in the shape of a star or pinwheel and filled with prune jam and often dusted with icing sugar. The pastries can be in other shapes and apple used in place of the prune jam.

Joulutorttus are mostly made in Finland but also in Sweden.

In 2020 a company that sells the dough estimated that the average Finn eats about 18 joulutorttua each year.

See also
 List of pastries
 Joulupöytä

References

External links
 Glossary of Finnish Dishes

Finnish cuisine
Christmas food
Plum dishes
Pastries